Gregory Michael Mensching, commonly known as Greg Mike, is an American artist. He began doing graffiti at age 13, and transitioned into murals in his later twenties.  He is known for street art, mural painting  and Loudmouf Icon in the United States, Australia, Canada and Switzerland.  In 2008, he founded ABV Gallery and Agency in Atlanta, GA which exhibits artists from around the world and works with brands on commercial design projects.

NFTs
Mike has been selling NFTs of his artwork since 2021, auctioning his art on NFT platform Nifty Gateway. His most famous work, the series "MAD CANS", consists in a series of digital collectable cans which also include a physical Infinite Object, raising over $3,000,000.

Works 
 "Pigment of my Imagination" Solo Exhibition at Maxwell Colette, Chicago, Illinois, 2014.
 2012: 'With Your Friends' Festival
 2015: Mural unveiling at Whisky Park
 2015: Vision Art Festival
 2016: Atlanta Art Culture
 2016: Outside Lands Art Festival
 2016: LA Public School in Street Art
 2016: Pow! Wow! Worcester, 10-day mural art festival

Awards 
 Mayor Joseph Petty presented key to the city of Worcester, Massachusetts Award to Mike in September 2016.
 Best Established Visual Artist - Creative Loafing 2017
 2017 Notable Georgians Award

See also 
 List of street artists

References

External links 
 2016: Interview with OZ Magazine
 2009: Interview with Formatmag.com
 2014: Interview with Bitchslap Magazine
 2016: Interview with Printsonwood
 2012: Interview with Vibe
 2010: Interview with Miami New Times
 2013: Interview with RVA Magazine

American male painters
21st-century American painters
American graffiti artists
American installation artists
Living people
Year of birth missing (living people)
Street artists
American muralists
American contemporary painters